Thliptoceras amamiale is a moth in the family Crambidae. It was described by Eugene G. Munroe and Akira Mutuura in 1968. It is found in Japan. Records for China refer to Thliptoceras sinensis.

References

Moths described in 1968
Pyraustinae